Samad Mohammed Fallah (born 2 May 1985) is an Indian first-class cricketer who plays for Maharashtra in domestic cricket. He is a left-arm medium-pace bowler who was previously a part of Rajasthan Royals squad in the Indian Premier League.

He was the joint-leading wicket-taker for Maharashtra in the 2018–19 Vijay Hazare Trophy, with fifteen dismissals in eight matches.

Notes

External links 

Living people
1985 births
Indian cricketers
Maharashtra cricketers
Rajasthan Royals cricketers
India Green cricketers
West Zone cricketers
Cricketers from Hyderabad, India